"Hot" is a song by Canadian singer-songwriter Avril Lavigne, taken as the third single from her third studio album, The Best Damn Thing (2007). The song was written by Lavigne and Evan Taubenfeld, while it was produced by Lukasz "Dr. Luke" Gottwald. The pop rock ballad talks about her feelings about a boyfriend, who makes her "hot". The song received positive reviews from music critics, who praised its "old-style" vibe and its anthemic nature. A version of the chorus in Mandarin was released in China and a version of the chorus in Japanese was released in Japan.

Commercially, the song was more successful in Australia, Canada and a few European countries, while it was a commercial disappointment in the United States. Lavigne performed the song at the 2007 MTV Europe Music Awards, American Music Awards, on The Friday Night Project and many more. The music video directed by Matthew Rolston shows Lavigne in a more "sexy" way, with a "1920s burlesque" theme.

Background and release 
After the success of her debut album, Let Go (2002), Lavigne released her second album, Under My Skin (2004), which debuted at number one in more than ten countries, went platinum within one month, and further established Lavigne as a pop icon. Later, a song that was co-written by Lavigne and ultimately cut from the final track list—"Breakaway"—was later given to Kelly Clarkson, who used it as the title track and lead-off single for her Grammy-winning second album. In July 2006, Lavigne married Sum 41's Deryck Whibley and spent most of the year working on her third album, enlisting blink-182 drummer Travis Barker to play drums, and cherry-picking a variety of producers (including her husband) to helm the recording sessions. Lavigne described the album as "really fast, fun, young, bratty, aggressive, confident, cocky in a playful way."

Lavigne worked with Evan Taubenfeld in four songs for the album, including "Hot". About working with Dr. Luke, the producer of the track, Lavigne said, "I met Luke [Gottwald] and we hit it off. I didn’t even know who he was. He came over to my house and we talked and we ended up in the studio for four months". After the success of the first two singles from "The Best Damn Thing" (2007), "Girlfriend" (which topped the Billboard charts, among others) and "When You're Gone" (which became a top-ten hit in many countries), Lavigne responded to a lawsuit that was brought against her claiming she copied a song for her hit "Girlfriend" and the accusations of songwriter Chantal Kreviazuk, who suggested that Lavigne ripped off one of her songs. Later, Lavigne released "Hot" as the album's third single, amidst the plagiarism controversies, on October 2007.

Composition and lyrics 
"Hot" was written by Avril Lavigne and Evan Taubenfeld, while Lukasz "Dr. Luke" Gottwald produced the song. The song is a pop rock ballad, that contains  new wave verses, as well as a "punchy" chorus, where Lavigne proclaims her lover's sweetness. In the chorus, Lavigne sings, "You make me so hot/You make me wanna drop." The song structurally takes a dramatic turn during the bridge in which she drops the persona of being crazy in love to candidly tell her lover how real and raw her emotions are, aside from the public display, "Kiss me gently, always, I know, hold me, love me, don't ever go," she sings softly. A Japanese version of the song was released as a ringtone in Japan, with the Japanese lyrics replacing the chorus. In China, a Mandarin version of the song was released which replaced the chorus and the introduction with Mandarin lyrics.

Reception

Critical 
"Hot" was praised by critics. Darryl Sterdan of Jam! Canoe wrote that the song is "more old-style Avril— except for the steamy Alanis-style lyrics." Chris Willman of Entertainment Weekly commented that while listening to the "sputtering chorus" of Hot kick in and smooth out, it's as if she and her Let Go team, The Matrix, never broke up.  Theon Weber of Stylus Magazine praised its "refined orgasm", while Fraser McAlpine of BBC Music praised its "nice new-wave verses, nice enormous chorus", calling it "anthemic and suits Avril's adenoidal rasp rather well." Alex Nunn of musicOMH noted that "Hot" is "one of the albums' three standout tracks", writing that "it really comes as little surprise to see his name attached to the albums best moments." Eric R. Danton of Connecticut Music called it "gushy power-ballad," while Lauren Murphy of Entertainment.ie named it "a well-produced, radio friendly tune that chugs perkily along without being irritating" and Danny R. Phillips of Hybrid Magazine called it a "heartfelt song."

Commercial 
The song was a commercial disappointment in the United States, only debuting and peaking at number 95 on the Billboard Hot 100 chart and fell off the chart the following week, becoming Avril's second weakest single in the U.S. to date. As of July 2013, "Hot" had sold 490,000 digital copies in the US. In Canada, the song proved to be successful, debuting at number 87 and peaking at number 10, remaining in its peak position for three consecutive weeks. In Australia, the single was a moderate success, debuting at number 42, on November 25, 2007, and peaking at number 14, on December 30, 2007, also remaining for three non-consecutive weeks at the peak position. In Austria, "Hot" became her ninth top-twenty single and in New Zealand, it managed to reach the top-forty. In the United Kingdom, "Hot" peaked at number 30, becoming her lowest-charting single there.

Music video

The music video for "Hot" was directed by Matthew Rolston and shot at the Beacon Hotel in
Jersey City, NJ during the first weekend of September 2007. The video was shot in Murdoch Hall, which also was used in several movies, including "Annie" and "Quiz Show". According to the press release, the video had a "1920s burlesque" theme, complete with girls in fishnets. "Ms. Lavigne had two personal masseuses tending to her during the shoot," the press release said. It premiered on Yahoo! Music, VIVA and MTV. The "Hot" music video debuted at #1 in Spain in its first week on the video download chart and reached #1 on the Australian iTunes music video chart too.

Synopsis 
The video mirrors the lyrical meaning of the song in many ways. The video begins with Lavigne, semi-disguised in a wig, making a grand entrance into a club in a black dress, with photographers and fans alike surrounding her. During the first verse she is seen in a dark, seductive outfit with very heavy makeup. In the chorus Lavigne is seen in a shiny, green corset preparing for what seems to be a rocker show. As such, she releases her emotions only when she's dressed the most revealingly and strongly. For the second chorus Lavigne makes her way on stage and continues to sing. During the song's bridge, in which Lavigne candidly reveals her raw feelings — about his love and kiss — Lavigne is dressed in a normal, plain outfit.

Live performances and promotion  
Lavigne performed the track in numerous places. The singer went to the 2007 MTV Europe Music Awards to perform the track, and additionally won two awards. She also performed the track at the World Music Awards of 2007. Lavigne also promoted the track at the American Music Awards of 2007. Lavigne continued the promotion of the song, singing it live at the Dancing with the Stars, on Canadian Idol and at Friday Night Project.

Track listings and formats
European and Taiwan CD single
"Hot"  – 3:23
"I Can Do Better" (Acoustic) – 3:39

Australian and Japanese CD single
"Hot"  – 3:23
"When You're Gone" (Acoustic Version) – 4:00
"Girlfriend" (Dr. Luke Remix) featuring Lil Mama – 3:24

Digital download (Japanese Version)
"Hot" (Japanese Version) – 3:25

Digital download (Mandarin Version)
"Hot" (Mandarin Version) – 3:24

Credits and personnel
Credits are adapted from The Best Damn Thing liner notes.
Vocals: Avril Lavigne
Songwriting: Avril Lavigne, Evan Taubenfeld
Production: Dr. Luke

Charts

Weekly charts

Year-end charts

Certifications

Release history

References

External links
"Hot" Music Video
Avril Lavigne's Official Site

2000s ballads
2007 singles
Avril Lavigne songs
RCA Records singles
Sony BMG singles
Music videos directed by Matthew Rolston
Songs written by Avril Lavigne
Song recordings produced by Dr. Luke
2007 songs
Songs written by Evan Taubenfeld
Pop ballads
Rock ballads

lt:The Best Damn Thing#Hot